Naho (written: 菜穂, 菜保, 奈穂, 南穂 or 直歩) is a feminine Japanese given name. Notable people with the name include:

, Japanese softball player
, Japanese basketball player
, Japanese mixed martial artist
, Japanese ice hockey player
, Japanese actress
, Japanese ice hockey player

See also
, Japanese women's footballer

Japanese feminine given names